Karimabad-e Muqufeh (also Romanized as Karīmābād-e Mūqūfeh; also known as Karīmābād) is a village in Kahrizak Rural District, Kahrizak District, Ray County, Tehran Province, Iran. At the 2006 census, its population was 464, in 103 families.

References 

Populated places in Ray County, Iran